Austroharpa tatei is an extinct species of sea snail, a marine gastropod mollusk, in the family Harpidae.

Distribution
This species occurs in Australian Exclusive Economic Zone.

References

tatei
Gastropods described in 1931